Brancaleone is a comune (municipality) in the Province of Reggio Calabria in the Italian region Calabria, located about  southwest of Catanzaro and about  southeast of Reggio Calabria.

Brancaleone borders the following municipalities: Bruzzano Zeffirio, Palizzi, Staiti.

Famed Italian poet and novelist Cesare Pavese was exiled here in 1935. Portions of his novel The Moon and the Bonfires refer to his time spent here.

Demographic evolution

References

Cities and towns in Calabria